Althaspis is an extinct genus of pteraspidid heterostracan agnathan.  Fossils are found in Early Devonian-aged marine strata of Europe

References

Pteraspidiformes genera
Devonian jawless fish
Devonian animals of Europe